Zhupa may refer to:
A phonetic spelling for Župa
Eugert Zhupa,  Albanian cyclist 
Ina Zhupa, Albanian political scientist